The 47th Volksgrenadier Division was a volksgrenadier division of the German Army during the Second World War, active from 1944 to 1945.

Operational history
The division was formed from the remnants of the 47th Infantry Division in Denmark in September 1944,  under the command of Lieutenant General Max Bork.

In mid-November, the division was ordered just east of the village of Gressnich, now part of Stolberg in North Rhine-Westphalia. Field Marshal Model, believing the division to be inexperienced, moved them out of the way of the American Ninth Army.

It remained in action on the Western Front, until it was destroyed in March 1945.

Commanders
Lieutenant General Max Bork (18 Sep 1944 - Feb 1945)
Colonel von Grundherr (Mar 1945 - Apr 1945)
Colonel Langesee (Apr 1945)
Major General Hauser (1945)

Components
103rd Grenadier Regiment
104th Grenadier Regiment
115th Grenadier Regiment
147th Artillery Regiment
147th (Bicycle) Fusilier Company
147th Pioneer Battalion
147th Anti-tank Battalion (mot)
147th Signals Battalion
147th Field-replacement Battalion

Sources

Military units and formations established in 1944
Military units and formations disestablished in 1945
Volksgrenadier divisions